Upsetter Records was a Jamaican record label set up by Lee "Scratch" Perry in 1968. Perry also opened the Upsetter Record Shop where he sold the records he produced.

Lee "Scratch" Perry worked for Coxsone Dodd's Studio One record label and later for Joe Gibbs's Amalgamated Records through the 1950s and 1960s. Amid personal and financial disagreements, he left, and in 1968 he formed his own label as an outlet for music he produced and his own recordings. The label was named Upsetter Records, and the house band was The Upsetters. "The Upsetter" was Perry's nickname after his 1968 single "I Am The Upsetter", a musical dismissal of his former boss Coxsone Dodd.

Upsetter Records signed a distribution deal with the U.K. based Trojan Records, and had its first success with Perry and The Upsetters' 1969 album Return of Django, which became a hit in the U.K. The label proceeded to release productions by many major Jamaican performers, including The Wailers and early sessions of Bob Marley and the Wailers.

In 1973, The Wailers left and signed up with Island Records. Aston "Family Man" Barrett and his brother Carlton (Carlie) Barrett left The Upsetters and formed the Wailers Band, the backing band of The Wailers, and later part of Bob Marley and the Wailers. Despite the setback, Perry turned his fortunes around when, in the same year, he built Black Ark Studios — which recorded for Upsetter Records and other labels, becoming a center of creativity in reggae music.

Upsetter Records continued to release records throughout the 1970s, and in 1981, Perry had a breakdown and burned down Black Ark Studios.

In 1989, after King Tubby's death, the studio was looted.

In 2014, Lee Perry reopened the label exclusively for the release of his new album "Back On the Controls" with London producer Daniel Boyle.

References

Reggae record labels
Jamaican record labels
Record labels established in 1968
Defunct record labels of Jamaica
1968 establishments in Jamaica
Companies based in Kingston, Jamaica